Methanocalculus halotolerans is a species of archaeon, the type species of its genus. It is an irregular coccoid hydrogenotrophic methanogen. Its type strain is SEBR 4845T (= OCM 470T).

Nomenclature
The name "Methanocalculus" has Latin roots, "methano" for methane and "calculus" for small round structure, "halo" for salt and "tolerans" for tolerant. In all, the name means salt-tolerant organism with a gravelly body that produces methane.

References

Further reading

Schaechter, Moselio. Encyclopedia of microbiology. Academic Press, 2009.

External links

LPSN
Type strain of Methanocalculus halotolerans at BacDive -  the Bacterial Diversity Metadatabase

Euryarchaeota
Archaea described in 1998